Feld Entertainment Inc. is an American live show production company which owns a number of traveling shows. The company began with the soon-to-return Ringling Bros. and Barnum & Bailey Circus then expanded into additional live events, including Disney on Ice (owned by The Walt Disney Company), Monster Jam, Monster Energy AMA Supercross, and Sesame Street Live (under license of Sesame Workshop). The company is family owned.

History
In 1967, Irvin Feld Israel Feld and Roy M. Hofheinz offered to purchase the  Ringling Bros. and Barnum & Bailey Circus. Broadway producers Cy Feuer and Ernest H. Martin sued in December 1967 to stop the sale. Nevertheless, the purchase of the combined circuses from the Ringling and North families to the Feld group took place for $8 million. The company was taken public in 1969. Kenneth Feld joined the business in 1970 after finishing college.

Mattel purchased the company in 1971 for $50 million in Mattel stock, while Feld continued managing the circus. After Walt Disney World opened near Orlando, Florida, in 1971, the circus company attempted to cash in on the resulting tourism surge by opening Circus World in nearby Haines City.<ref name=ppl>{{cite news|last1=Langdon|first1=Dolly|title=Lord of the Rings' Irvin Feld Has Made a Fading Circus the Greatest Show on Earth Again|url=http://www.people.com/people/archive/article/0,,20076452,00.html|access-date=August 4, 2015|work=People|date=May 12, 1980}}</ref> Irvin & Kenneth Feld Productions in 1979 purchased from Chicago-based Bill Wirtz the Holiday on Ice and Ice Follies for $12 million. The company soon approached Disney about doing a Disney show on ice. By 1980, the company produced 10 circus and ice show TV specials. An investment was also made in Barnum, the Broadway musical. In 1981, Ken Feld started the Beyond Belief show at the New Frontier Hotel and Casino.

The Felds bought the company back in 1982 for $22.8 million. By then, the business included Holiday on Ice, Ice Follies, Walt Disney's World on Ice, and Beyond Belief Las Vegas nightclub act. Circus World was sold to Arizona developer James Monaghan in 1984. Ringlings' third touring company, Gold Unit, premiered on July 1, 1988, in Japan. In late 1988, Beyond Belief Las Vegas act went on an international tour.

Feld Entertainment
In , Irvin & Kenneth Feld Productions, Inc. changed its name to Feld Entertainment, Inc. In 2001, Ken Feld began gifting shares of Feld Entertainment to his three daughters Nicole, Alana and Juliette Feld. Nicole was hired into the family business in 2001 and became the first female producer of the Ringling Bros. Circus in 2004. Alana also signed on in 2003.

Due to an accident in October 2003, the Siegfried & Roy show was closed. FE started producing Disney Live! shows in June 2004 with Winnie the Pooh in the United Kingdom. Alana produced the first Doodlebops Live! in 2006. In 2006, Nicole was a vice president in charge of the circus. The company sold its Vienna, Virginia headquarters in May 2006 to America's Capital Partners then leased it back until 2018. In 2007, Nicole and Alana were elevated to executive vice president of the company.

The company signed a 10-year agreement with Disney Live Family Entertainment for Disney on Ice, Disney Live and other Disney productions in August 2008. In September, Feld also acquired the motorsports division of Live Nation, including the properties of Monster Jam (and several associated monster trucks), Supercross, Arenacross, and the IHRA. The motor sport division was renamed Feld Entertainment Motor Sports. Feld Motor Sports launched its first new arena-based freestyle motocross touring production, Nuclear Cowboyz, in 2010. Feld Motor Sports sold the IHRA to IRG Sports + Entertainment in 2012.

Feld Entertainment and Zignia Live, management company of Arena Ciudad de Mexico and Arena Monterrey, signed a promotion agreement in April 2011 bringing any of Feld shows to Zingia's managed arenas for a total of 18 weeks. This brings back the Ringling Bros circus in May 2012 that had been absent from Mexico since 2002.

In January 2012, the company purchased Palmetto Corporate Center, a former Siemens Corp. complex in Ellenton, Florida, and plans to move most of its various operations and its world headquarters there over a five-year period starting with its worldwide production center. Feld agreed in October 2013 to occupy a to be built 241,457-square-foot warehouse in the Baltimore-Washington Industrial Park, Jessup, Maryland expected to be finished in November 2014 to consolidated two other warehouse elsewhere in the industrial park used for merchandise.  In 2015, Feld Motor Sports HQ moved from Illinois to Ellenton.

In March 2013, Feld agreed with Marvel Entertainment, which was acquired by The Walt Disney Company in 2009, to produce Marvel Universe Live!, a Marvel character-based live arena show.  Marketing campaign company Cimarron Group was hired in 2013 by Feld Entertainment for all media campaign for Marvel Live and other Feld shows. The Cimarron Group however shut down August 2013.

Juliette Feld was promoted to chief operating officer of the corporation in February 2016.
In November 2016, Feld Entertainment and Sesame Workshop announced an agreement for a new Sesame Street Live show to debut in October 2017 to replace one by VStar Entertainment Group ending in July 2017.

Citing low attendance rates, Feld Entertainment announced the Ringling Bros. and Barnum & Bailey Circus would close after their final performance on May 21, 2017. The retirement of the elephants was a factor in the decreased attendance, but the company would continue operating its Center for Elephant Conservation. It is set to return in 2023, but with the animal acts removed.

Feld Entertainment entered into the amusement and attractions industry again. Feld and Universal Brand Development has agreed to develop multiple properties into mobile pop-up attractions in April 2018. The first being DreamWorks Trolls: The Experience starting its tour in the third quarter 2018 in New York. At the IAAPA Attractions Expo 2018, Feld offered two concepts at the expo, a Monster Jam roller coaster and Ringling Bros. and Barnum & Bailey Circus interactive stations. In September 2019, Feld and Universal will start its joint touring show, Jurassic World Live Tour, in Columbus, Ohio.

Units
Feld Entertainment owns:
Feld Consumer Products, concession and merchandising division in Jessup, Maryland
Feld Motor Sports, Inc.
Monster Jam
AMA Supercross Championship
International Hot Rod Association Nitro Jam (2008–2012)
Nuclear Cowboyz (2010–2013)
 Hagenbeck–Wallace, Inc., a property, costume and scenic design company
Ice Follies And Holiday on Ice, Inc. produces: 
Disney on Ice, originally Walt Disney's World on Ice
Classic Ice Spectaculars
Ringling Bros. and Barnum & Bailey Circus (1967–2017, 2023–)

Live show productions
Disney Live!Winnie the Pooh (–2005) United Kingdom, Spain, The Netherlands, Australia and New Zealand (–2006) USA (2006–) JapanMickey’s Magic ShowPlayhouse Disney / Disney Junior Live:Playhouse Disney Live on Tour! The show has 15-minute interactive pre-show segment, Playhouse Disney Pre-Show Party, with video highlights.Pirate & Princess Adventure features Sofia the First and Jake and the Never Land PiratesThree Classic Fairy Tales (opened May 2008) China)Mickey's Music FestivalMickey and Minnie’s Doorway to Magic (Brazil –2016)  (US Early 2016–) The show is directed and choreographed by Fred Tallaksen and produced by Alana Feld.

OthersBeyblade LIVE（2001-2003）Beyblade LIVE（2001）Beyblade V-Force LIVE（2002）Beyblade G-Revolution LIVE（2003）Beyblade: Metal Saga THE LIVE（2009-2012）Beyblade: Metal Fusion THE LIVE（2009）Beyblade: Metal Masters THE LIVE（2010）Beyblade: Metal Fury THE LIVE（2011）Beyblade: Shogun Steel THE LIVE（2012）Beyblade Burst THE LIVE STAGE（2016-）Beyblade Burst THE LIVE STAGE（2016）Beyblade Burst Evolution THE LIVE STAGE（2017）Beyblade Burst Turbo THE LIVE STAGE（2018）Beyblade Burst Rise THE LIVE STAGE（2019）Beyblade Burst Surge THE LIVE STAGE（2020）Beyblade Burst QuadDrive THE LIVE STAGE（2021）Doodlebops Live! (2006–)High School Musical Summer Celebration (2009–
 Marvel Universe Live! "Willow," "American Graffiti," the Indiana Jones series, "Tucker" and the "Star Wars" movies were all included in the story.Goosebumps–Live on StageDisney’s Phineas and Ferb: The Best Live Tour Ever! (August 2011 — February 2013)
 Sesame Street Live (October 2017—)
Sesame Street, Beaches Resorts
Sesame Street, SeaWorld theme parks
Sesame Street, Sesame Place in Middletown Township, Pa and Chula Vista, CA.
 Jurassic World Live Tour (September 2019—) started in Columbus, Ohio moved across part of the Midwest and East Coast

Pop-up attractions
DreamWorks Trolls: The Experience (New York October 22, 2018)

Theatrical
(most on Broadway):BigBarnumLargely New YorkFool MoonMADhattan in  Las VegasThree Musketeers'' musical (1984)

References

External links
 
, Feld Motor Sports, Inc, subsidiary producer of Monster Jam, Supercross, Arenacross, Nuclear Cowboyz
, license property show produced by Feld
, DreamWorks Trolls The Experience

 
Motorcycle racing
Ice shows
Companies based in Manatee County, Florida
Entertainment companies established in 1967
American companies established in 1967
Former Mattel subsidiaries